The Quantum Archangel is a BBC Books original novel written by Craig Hinton and based on the long-running British science fiction television series Doctor Who. It features the Sixth Doctor and Mel, the Master, and an appearance by an alternate version of the Third Doctor.

Plot
The Doctor and Mel must work through personal problems in order to defeat Kronos, a powerful being seeking revenge on the Master.

Continuity
 The story is a sequel to the 1972 television serial The Time Monster.
 The Master and the Doctor are the only Time Lords who have survived a time ram.
 Previous to this book, the Doctor and Mel have fought the Daleks, the Nestenes, rogue Bandrils from Timelash, and the Quarks from The Dominators.

External links
The Cloister Library - The Quantum Archangel

Reviews
 

2001 British novels
2001 science fiction novels
Past Doctor Adventures
Sixth Doctor novels
Novels by Craig Hinton
The Master (Doctor Who) novels
The Rani (Doctor Who) stories